A large quasar group (LQG) is a collection of quasars (a form of supermassive black hole active galactic nuclei) that form what are thought to constitute the largest astronomical structures in the observable universe.  LQGs are thought to be precursors to the sheets, walls and filaments of galaxies found in the relatively nearby universe.

Prominent LQGs
On January 11, 2013, the discovery of the Huge-LQG was announced by the University of Central Lancashire, as the largest known structure in the universe by that time. It is composed of 74 quasars and has a minimum diameter of 1.4 billion light-years, but over 4 billion light-years at its widest point. According to researcher and author, Roger Clowes, the existence of structures with the size of LQGs was believed theoretically impossible.  Cosmological structures had been believed to have a size limit of approximately 1.2 billion light-years.

List of LQGs

See also
 List of largest cosmic structures
 Large-scale structure of the cosmos

References

Further reading
 R. G. Clowes; "Large Quasar Groups - A Short Review"; 'The New Era of Wide Field Astronomy', ASP Conference Series, Vol. 232.; 2001; Astronomical Society of the Pacific;  ; 

Large Quasar Group